Lewica literally meaning "the left" in Polish may refer to the following Polish left-wing parties:
Polish Socialist Party – Left
The Left (Poland)
Lewica Razem
Polish People's Party "Left" (Polskie Stronnictwo Ludowe "Lewica")
Polish Left (Polska Lewica)

See also
United Left (Poland) (Zjednoczona Lewica)
The Left (disambiguation)